DKids, also known as Discovery Kids, was a children's television channel owned by Discovery, Inc. It was an edition of the Discovery Kids channel that aired in the MENA region and was available in both English and Arabic. It first launched on August 1, 2016 and was broadcast via beIN Network.

Original Finale programming
 Agi Bagi
 Anabel
 Animanimals
 Astroblast!
 The Bagel and Becky Show
 Gawayn
 Bob the Builder
 Coconut the Little Dragon
 Daisy & Ollie
 Doki
 Dr. Panda
 Earth to Luna
 Esme & Roy
 Fishtronaut
 Four and a Half Friends
 The Fo-Fo Figgily Show
 Gon
 Helen's Little School
 Hi-5 (Season 17)
 Insectibles
 Jay's Jungle
 Kody Kapow
 Lilybuds
 Littlest Pet Shop
 Magiki
 The Ollie & Moon Show
 Paper Tales
 Pip Ahoy!
 Planet Cosmo
 Plim Plim
 Purple Turtle
 Robot Trains
 Sesame Street (Season 47)
 Shutterbugs
 Sinbad and the 7 Galaxies
 Smighties
 Suzy's Zoo: Adventures in Duckport
 The 99
 Vroomiz
 The ZhuZhus

Former programming
 3 Amigonauts
 Invention Story

References

External links

Discovery Kids
Children's television networks
Defunct television channels
Television channels and stations established in 2016
Television channels and stations disestablished in 2021
Television stations in the United Arab Emirates
Television stations in Saudi Arabia
Television stations in Egypt
Television channels in Jordan
Television stations in Morocco
Television stations in Libya
Television stations in Lebanon
Television stations in Iraq
Television stations in Algeria
Television stations in Tunisia
Television stations in Kuwait
Television stations in the State of Palestine
Television channels in Syria
Television stations in Yemen
Warner Bros. Discovery EMEA